Reuben Hersh (December 9, 1927 – January 3, 2020) was an American mathematician and academic, best known for his writings on the nature, practice, and social impact of mathematics. Although he was generally known as Reuben Hersh, late in life he sometimes used the name Reuben Laznovsky in recognition of his father's ancestral family name. His work challenges and complements mainstream philosophy of mathematics.

Education 
After receiving a B.A. in English literature from Harvard University in 1946, Hersh spent a decade writing for Scientific American and working as a machinist. After losing his right thumb when working with a band saw, he decided to study mathematics at the Courant Institute of Mathematical Sciences. In 1962, he was awarded a Ph.D. in mathematics from New York University; his advisor was P.D. Lax. He was affiliated with the University of New Mexico since 1964, where he was professor emeritus.

Academic career 
Hersh wrote a number of technical articles on partial differential equations, probability, random evolutions (example), and linear operator equations. He was the co-author of four articles in Scientific American, and 12 articles in the Mathematical Intelligencer.

Hersh was best known as the co-author with Philip J. Davis of The Mathematical Experience (1981), which won a National Book Award in Science. Hersh and Martin Davis won the 1984 Chauvenet Prize for their Scientific American article on Hilbert's tenth problem.

Hersh advocated what he called a "humanist" philosophy of mathematics, opposed to both Platonism (so-called "realism") and its rivals nominalism/fictionalism/formalism.  He held that mathematics is real, and its reality is social-cultural-historical, located in the shared thoughts of those who learn it, teach it, and create it. His article "The Kingdom of Math is Within You" (a chapter in his Experiencing Mathematics, 2014) explains how mathematicians' proofs compel agreement, even when they are inadequate as formal logic.  He sympathized with the perspectives on mathematics of Imre Lakatos and Where Mathematics Comes From, George Lakoff and Rafael Nunez, Basic Books.

Books

 1981, Hersh and Philip Davis. The Mathematical Experience. (Mariner Books, 1999).
 1986, Hersh and Philip Davis. Descartes' Dream: The World According to Mathematics. (Dover, 2005)
 1997. What Is Mathematics, Really? Oxford Univ. Press.
 2006, edited by Hersh. 18 Unconventional Essays on the Nature of Mathematics. Springer Verlag.
 2009, Hersh and Vera John-Steiner. Loving and Hating Mathematics. Princeton University Press
Greenwood, P.; Hersh, R. "Stochastic differentials and quasi-standard random variables", Probabilistic methods in differential equations (Proc. Conf., Univ. Victoria, Victoria, B. C., 1974), pp. 35–62. Lecture Notes in Math., Vol. 451, Springer, Berlin, 1975.
2014, Reuben Hersh. Experiencing Mathematics: What do we do, when we do mathematics? American Mathematical Society.
2015, Reuben Hersh. Peter Lax:  Mathematician.  American Mathematical Society.

See also
Influence of non-standard analysis

Notes

References

External links 
Humanizing Mathematics and its Philosophy: Essays celebrating the 90th Birthday of Reuben Hersh 
The Ideal Mathematician, with Phillip Davis (Note: Google.com, somewhat unfortunately, decides to redirect this link weirdly, as of May 2018).
Web page at the Univ. of New Mexico.
Published Articles at googlesites.
AMS video interview with Reuben Hersh part 1

20th-century American mathematicians
21st-century American mathematicians
Mathematics writers
National Book Award winners
Philosophers of mathematics
2020 deaths
1927 births
American science writers
Harvard University alumni
Courant Institute of Mathematical Sciences alumni
University of New Mexico faculty